Joynagar is a locality in Agartala, the capital of the Indian state of Tripura. It has 6 lanes. There are 4 clubs that conduct Durga Puja every year. It is a robust market place as well, one of the finest residential areas in the state.

Home of Sapto Sindhu, Trinayani, Yuba Samaj, Aguntuk Club, 
JPC, Dashami Ghat and NaboDiganto Clubs. Joynagar is situated at the western side of the town Agartala. The closest landmark of Joynagar is the Battala Bazaar which is one of the largest market place of the state. The beautiful Joynagar Lake adds to its charm. The Puja Pandal of Yuba Samaj is generally on the or at the banks of the same. Along with all the Puja pandals of the clubs, there are a lot of Durga Pujas held at different noted houses. Some of the noted household Durga Pujas are : "T.B.Roy Baari","Bijoy Majumder'r Baari","Malancha", "Ameen Baari" & the latest addition being "Banerjee Bari (Lane no : 3)".

People say,"Maa Durga gives her last visit here before leaving" as the Dashami Ghat (Immersion point)falls in the same area. The two sides Joynagar has two very important points of the city, the Joynagar bus stand (every famous procession of the city passes through) & the Dashami Ghat (place where The full city gathers to watch the immersion of Maa Durga)

The locality also happens to be home of some of the noted personalities of Tripura. Namely, Late Biren Datta, Tripura's First Member of Parliament, State Minister and CPIM's 1 of the Nationwide Veteran Leaders and Tarapada Banerjee, one of the premiere leaders in Tripura's Communist Era.

Neighbourhoods in Agartala